Mark or Marc Davies may refer to:

Mark Davies (athlete) (1960–2011), Australian Paralympic athlete
Mark Davies (footballer, born 1988), English footballer with Bolton Wanderers
Mark Davies (South African soccer)
Mark Davies (rugby union) (born 1958), Wales international rugby union player
Mark Davies (cricketer, born 1980), former English cricketer
Mark Davies (cricketer, born 1959), former Welsh cricketer
Mark Davies (cricketer, born 1969), former Welsh cricketer
Mark Davies (cricketer, born 1962), former English cricketer
Mark Davies (bishop of Middleton) (born 1962), British Anglican bishop
Mark Davies (bishop of Shrewsbury) (born 1959), British Roman Catholic bishop
Mark Davies (linguist) (born 1963), professor of linguistics at Brigham Young University
Marc Davies, character in The Man from Saigon

See also
Mark Davis (disambiguation)
Marc Davis (disambiguation)